Ispat Autonomous College is a co-ed educational institute in Rourkela, in the north-west part of Odisha. The courses of the college at the higher secondary level are affiliated to CHSE, Odisha, and under-graduate and post-graduate level courses are offered in affiliation with Sambalpur University, Odisha. It is a private autonomous college recognised by the UGC and Department of Higher Education, Odisha.

Departments
The college runs with three streams, both +2 and +3 level.

Faculty in Arts

Faculty in Commerce
 Accounting

Faculty in Science

Courses offered

References

Department of Higher Education, Odisha
Autonomous Colleges of Odisha
Business schools in Odisha
Universities and colleges in Rourkela
Educational institutions established in 1978
1978 establishments in Orissa